Sharada Municipality is a municipality located in Salyan District of Karnali Province in western  Nepal. This municipality was formed on May 18, 2014. It was formed by merging seven Village Development Committees: Dandagaun, Hiwalcha, Kajeri, Khalanga, Marke, Saijuwal Takura and Syanikhal.

At the time of the 1991 Nepal census, it had a population of 6,390. According to the latest census from 2011, the population in the meantime has increased to 23,730.

Demographics
At the time of the 2011 Nepal census, 99.1% of the population in Shaarada Municipality spoke Nepali and 0.5% Newar as their first language; 0.4% spoke other languages.

In terms of ethnicity/caste, 62.6% were Chhetri, 8.2% Sanyasi/Dasnami, 7.7% Kami, 5.9% Magar, 3.2% Sarki, 3.1% Newar, 3.0% Hill Brahmin, 2.9% Thakuri, 1.7% Damai/Dholi and 1.7% others.

In terms of religion, 97.8% were Hindu, 1.7% Christian, 0.2% Muslim and 0.3% others.

References

External links
UN map of the municipalities of Salyan District

Populated places in Salyan District, Nepal
Nepal municipalities established in 2014
Municipalities in Karnali Province